The 1950–51 NBA season was the Olympians' 2nd season in the NBA.

NBA draft

Roster

|-
! colspan="2" style="background-color: #89CFF0;  color: #FFFFFF; text-align: center;" | Indianapolis Olympians 1950–51 roster
|- style="background-color: #FF0000; color: #FFFFFF;   text-align: center;"
! Players !! Coaches
|- 
| valign="top" |

! Pos. !! # !! Nat. !! Name !! Ht. !! Wt. !! From
|-

Regular season

Season standings

Record vs. opponents

Game log

Playoffs

West Division Semifinals 
(1) Minneapolis Lakers vs. (4) Indianapolis Olympians: Lakers win series 2-1
Game 1 @ Minneapolis: Minneapolis 95, Indianapolis 81
Game 2 @ Indianapolis: Indianapolis 108, Minneapolis 88
Game 3 @ Minneapolis: Minneapolis 85, Indianapolis 80

Awards and records
Alex Groza, All-NBA First Team
Ralph Beard, All-NBA First Team

References

Indianapolis Olympians seasons
Indianapolis